The results of the 2019 Little League World Series were determined between August 15 and August 25, 2019 in South Williamsport, Pennsylvania. 16 teams were divided into two groups, one with eight teams from the United States and another with eight international teams, with both groups playing a modified double-elimination tournament. In each group, the last remaining undefeated team faced the last remaining team with one loss, with the winners of those games advancing to play for the Little League World Series championship.

Double-elimination stage

United States

Winner's Bracket

Game 2: Virginia 3, Rhode Island 0

Game 4: Minnesota 2, Kentucky 1

Game 6: Hawaii 5, Louisiana 2

Game 8: New Jersey 6, Oregon 2

Game 14: Virginia 11, Minnesota 0

Game 16: Hawaii 6, New Jersey 0

Game 24: Hawaii 12, Virginia 9

Loser's Bracket

Game 10: Rhode Island 6, Kentucky 1

Game 12: Louisiana 3, Oregon 2

Game 18: New Jersey 2, Rhode Island 0

Game 20: Louisiana 10, Minnesota 0

Game 22: Louisiana 4, New Jersey 1

Game 26: Louisiana 10, Virginia 0

International

Winner's Bracket

Game 1: Curaçao 11, Australia 0

Game 3: South Korea 10, Venezuela 3

Game 5: Japan 20, Italy 0

Game 7: Mexico 5, Canada 0

Game 13: South Korea 4, Curaçao 0

Game 15: Japan 5, Mexico 0

Game 23: Japan 7, South Korea 2

Loser's Bracket

Game 9: Venezuela 2, Australia 0

Game 11: Canada 10, Italy 0

Game 17: Venezuela 8, Mexico 7

Game 19: Curaçao 8, Canada 1

Game 21: Curaçao 9, Venezuela 2

Game 25: Curaçao 5, South Korea 3

Consolation games

Game A: Kentucky 4, Australia 1

Game B: Oregon 4, Italy 3

Single-elimination stage

International championship: Curaçao 5, Japan 4

United States championship: Louisiana 9, Hawaii 5

Third place game: Japan 5, Hawaii 0

World championship game: Louisiana 8, Curaçao 0

References

External links
Full schedule from littleleague.org

2019 Little League World Series